Mike John Wingfield FAAS FRSSAf is a South African an international expert on plants' health, and the founding director of the Forestry and Agricultural Biotechnology Institute, University of Pretoria. Wingfield is a well celebrated scientists, and has been featured in the Web of Science list of the world's most cited researchers since 2018. He has three fungi named after him: Leptographium wingfieldii [sv], Sterigmatomyces wingfieldii, and Asterina wingfieldii.

Early life and education 
Mike John Wingfield was born on 21 April 1954 in Durban, South Africa. He earned a Bachelor of Science in Botany from the University of Natal in 1976, before completing a Master of Science in plant pathology from the Plant Protection Research Institute, Stellenbosch University, in 1979, graduating with Honours. He earned his doctorate in entomology and plant pathology from the University of Minnesota in 1983. Wingfield also graduated from the Advanced Management Program at Harvard Business School in 2008.

Career 
At the Plant Protection Research Institute, Stellenbosch University, Wingfield started the country's first forest pathology research programme in 1978. After earning his PhD, he continued the program's expansion. In 1990, he was promoted to full professor in the Department of Microbiology and Biochemistry at the University of the Free State after relocating there in 1988. Wingfield was named to the Mondi Paper Co. Ltd. Chair in forest pathology in 1994.
 
Wingfield was the founding director of the Forestry and Agricultural Biotechnology Institute (FABI), University of Pretoria, until 2007. FABI was founded in 1998 due to Wingfield's work in 1990 to create the Tree Protection Co-operative Programme. He continued as a Professor at FABI and an advisor to the Executive Board of the University of Pretoria.
 
Wingfield was the director of the Centre of Excellence in Tree Health Biotechnology, National Research Foundation, and the President of the International Union of Forest Research Organizations (IUFRO) between 2014 and 2019. His collaboration with Chinese academics led to the formation of the CERC/FABI Tree Protection Programme (CFTPP), a joint venture between the FABI and the China Eucalyptus Research Centre (CERC).

Research 
Wingfield research focuses on forest protection and health, mycology, entomology, and biotechnology. He worked on several projects and partnerships throughout the globe, and his study has improved the knowledge of some of the most complicated and harmful diseases that affect pine, eucalyptus, and other significant plants. He and his students have added new understanding about various pathogens, including Ceratocystis, Ophiostoma, Mycosphaerella, Fusarium, Cryphonectria, and Armillaria species. His studies on insects that work with some tree diseases' causative agents or serve as their vectors have a significant impact. His team has used traditional and molecular approaches to classify and distinguish infections, define a novel, sometimes cryptic species, and determine evolutionary connections. The evolution of host resistance, international quarantines, and disease management are only a few examples of the many fields in which the results of this fundamental study have found practical applications.
 
Wingfield is an international expert on plants, health with an h-index of 115 and more than 65 000 citations as of December 2022. He has been featured in the Web of Science list of the world's most cited researchers since 2018.

Awards and honours 
Wingfield is a member of the Academy of Science of South Africa. He was elected a Fellow of the Royal Society of South Africa in 1998, and a Fellow of the African Academy of Sciences in 2016.
 
For his contributions and collaboration in the field of forestry, Wingfield was awarded the Christiaan Hendrik Persoon Medal by the Southern African Society for Plant Pathology society in 1999, the University of Pretoria Chancellor's Medal Award in 2008, the Johanna Westerdijk award from the CBS-KNAW Fungal Biodiversity Centre, Netherlands in 2012, the Kwame Nkrumah Award from the African Union in 2013, the University of Minnesota's Distinguished Leadership Award in 2016, John Herschel Medal, the highest accolade from the Royal Society of South Africa, in 2017, the Chinese Government's Friendship Award in 2017, National Science and Technology Forum-South32 Special Annual Theme Award: Plant Health on 30 July 2020, and Harry Oppenheimer Fellowship Award in 2022.
 
Wingfield received an honorary doctorate of science (DSc) from the University of British Columbia in 2012, and the North Carolina State University in 2013.
 
Wingfield has three fungi named after him: Leptographium wingfieldii [sv], Sterigmatomyces wingfieldii, and Asterina wingfieldii.

Personal life 
Wingfield is married to Brenda D. Fairbairn, one of his main collaborators, a professor of genetics and Deputy Dean at the University of Pretoria, and an Associate Fellow of the African Academy of Sciences since 2016.

References

External links 
 
 A global perspective on tree health: Celebrating the United Nations 2020 International Year of Plant Health. Innagural lecture by Prof. Mike Wingfield on 29 June 2021 at the National Science and Technology Forum on YouTube.

South African scientists
1954 births
Living people
University of Minnesota alumni
Stellenbosch University alumni
Academic staff of the University of Pretoria
Fellows of the African Academy of Sciences
Fellows of the Royal Society of South Africa